The Vachathi case involved a mass crime that occurred on 20 June 1992 in the village of Vachathi, in Dharmapuri district, Tamil Nadu. A team of 155 forest personnel, 108 policemen and six revenue officials entered the Tribal-dominated Vachathi village, searching for smuggled sandalwood and to gather information about Veerappan. Under the pretext of conducting a search, the team ransacked the villagers' property, destroyed their houses, killed their cattle, assaulted around 100 villagers, and raped 18 women.

After a court order, the CBI began probing the case, which was also under the scope of the NHRC.
On 29 September 2011, a special court in India convicted all 269 accused officials under the SC/ST Prevention of Atrocities act and 17 for rape. Fifty-four of the original accused had died by the time of the convictions; the remaining 215 were sentenced to jail.

Background
During June 1992, the villagers, who were mostly tribals, prevented forest and revenue officials from entering the hamlet. The officials complained that the villagers were involved in sandalwood smuggling and aiding Veerappan, a notorious forest brigand. During the evening, 269 officials, being 155 forest personnel, 108 policemen and six revenue officials, raided the village and herded the villagers under a tree. A hundred men from the village were brutally assaulted while 18 women were gangraped. The raid continued for two days when the hamlet was demolished.

Trial
The trial was held at Dharmapuri Principal District Court. There were 269 accused in the case that had 155 forest personnel, 108 policemen, and six revenue officials. All the 269 who were accused were sentenced on 29 September 2011. Of the 269, 54 died during the trial. Of the remaining 215, 126 belonged to the forest department, 84 were policemen, and five were revenue officials. Out of the 17 rapists, 12 were sentenced to 17 years imprisonment and 5 had 5 years. The rest of the accused were sentenced to one to two years in prison.

Aftermath
Police were not ready to accept the case for three years and the then state minister K. A. Sengottaiyan commented that the villagers were aiding sandalwood smuggling. The villagers were denied compensation for a long time. On 12 September 2014, the state government offered a compensation of 12.2 lakh to all the victims. An additional 60,000 was allocated to each of the 105 villagers who were drafted in the chargesheet filed in 1999. The chargesheet was quashed by the court during November 2012.

Movie on the Incident

The entire incident has been made into a film by the name Vachathi, and a novel called Solagar Thotti.

See also
 Operation Cocoon

External links
 Vachathi Film on The Hindu

References 

Dharmapuri district
Rape in India
Police misconduct in India
Crime in Tamil Nadu
1992 crimes in India
Organised crime events in India
Violence against Dalits in Tamil Nadu